Virgil (1864–1886) was an American thoroughbred racehorse that was bred in Kentucky by Hyman C. Gratz. He was a brown to dark bay stallion, was approximately 16 hands high and had a prominent white star on his forehead.[2] His sire, Vandal, was the second leading sire of the time, behind the great Lexington. Virgil was a direct descendant of the thoroughbred foundation sire Herod and was the leading sire in the United States in 1885.

Virgil was trained as a flat-racer, buggy racer and jumper. He had a total of 8 starts on the flat racing circuit, netting 6 wins. Virgil tended to run his best in races less than 1½ miles. In 1869, Virgil was bought by R.W. Simmons, who trained him for steeple chasing.

After his racing and jumping career, he was briefly contracted as a logging horse, which took its toll on his joints and appearance.[1]

He was eventually bought in the 1870s by Milton Sanford. His stud career at Sanford's Elmendorf Farm was started by accident when Virgil was allowed to stand in for Sanford's regular stallion, Glenelg. Sanford briefly sold Virgil to B.G. Bruce but bought him back for $2500 after Vagrant won the Kentucky Derby in 1876.[2] Virgil remained at Elmendorf Stud until his death at the age of 22 in September 1886.[2]

He is the sire of three Kentucky Derby winners: Vagrant (1876), Hindoo (1881) and Ben Ali (1886). He also sired other successful flat-racers Tremont, Virgilian and Carley B., winner of the 1882 Travers Stakes.

Sire line tree

Virgil
Vigil
Vagrant
Hindoo
Merry Monarch
Hanover
Buck Massie
Jake
Buckleya
Halma
Alan-a-Dale
Smart Set
Acacia
Oversight
Hammon
Handsome
The Commoner
Simon D.
Johnnie Blake
Doctor Boots
Countless
Parmer
Great Britain
Ben Holladay
Handspring
Major Daingerfield
Handout
Heywood
Palo Alto
Hamburg
Inflexible
Strephon
Dandelion
Battleaxe
Burgomaster
Orison
The Irishman
Baby Wolf
Hillside
Borrow
Buskin
Prince Eugene
Happy Go Lucky
Handball
Handsel
Grover Hughes
Colonel Livingstone
Sanders
Half Time
Handcuff
David Garrick
Star of Hanover
Withers
Admonition
Holstein
Abe Frank
Black Stock
Mentor
Kaffir
Kaffir Boy
King Hanover
Prince Ahmed
Luck and Charity
Serpent
Yankee
Dinna Ken
Yankee Gun
Joe Madden
Marse Abe
Naushon
Nonpareil
Penobscot
Jim Gore
Beau Gallant
Gorman
Merry Lark
Buddhist
Hindoocraft
Dungarvan
J. H. Houghton
Aryan
Macy
Benroe
Howland
Miller
Alard Scheck
Van Buren
Carley B.
Vanguard
Isaac Murphy
Ben Ali
Tremont
Tremor

References

1864 racehorse births
1886 racehorse deaths
Racehorses bred in Kentucky
Racehorses trained in the United States
United States Champion Thoroughbred Sires
Byerley Turk sire line
Thoroughbred family 20